The Tom W. Bonner Prize in Nuclear Physics is an annual prize awarded by the American Physical Society's Division of Nuclear Physics. Established in 1964, and currently consisting of $10,000 and a certificate, the Bonner Prize was founded in memory of physicist Tom W. Bonner. The aim of the prize, as stated by the American Physical Society is:
To recognize and encourage outstanding experimental research in nuclear physics, including the development of a method, technique, or device that significantly contributes in a general way to nuclear physics research. The Bonner Prize is generally awarded for individual achievement in experimental research, but can be awarded for exceptional theoretical work and to groups who have contributed to a single accomplishment.

Recipients

See also

 List of physics awards

References

Tom W. Bonner Prize in Nuclear Physics, American Physical Society

External links
APS Division of Nuclear Physics

Awards of the American Physical Society
Nuclear physics